Indian Fields, Nova Scotia  is an unincorporated community and provincial park reserve in the Municipality of the District of Shelburne, Nova Scotia, Canada, on Route 203 at an elevation of about 70m. There is an area of meadows. The few households that make up the community are not serviced by Nova Scotia Power. There is an abandoned airfield near the junction of Indian Fields Road and Route 203.

The park reserve—an area of Crown land that has been set aside for potential development and management as a provincial park—has an area of 1,619 hectares, some of which is in Yarmouth County. It has natural and
cultural heritage values and provides opportunities for outdoor recreation. It adjoins the Tobeatic Wilderness Area and provides habitat for the endangered mainland moose. It borders several lakes with fresh-water beaches, and sections of the Roseway and Clyde rivers.

See also
 Indian old field

References

General Service Areas in Nova Scotia
Communities in Shelburne County, Nova Scotia
Provincial parks of Nova Scotia